McNeil is a town in Columbia County, Arkansas, United States. The population was 516 at the 2010 census, down from 662 in 2000. The community was named after William B. McNeil, founder of the College Hill Academy.

Geography
McNeil is located in northern Columbia County at  (33.346030, -93.208276).

Logoly State Park, part of the Arkansas State Parks System, is located just east of McNeil, off Highway 79. Most of Logoly's  comprise a State Natural Area that includes unique plant species and mineral springs.

Demographics

As of the census of 2000, there were 662 people, 237 households, and 165 families residing in the city. The racial makeup of the city was 40.33% White, 58.31% Black or African American, 0.15% Asian, and 1.21% from two or more races.  1.36% of the population were Hispanic or Latino of any race.

There were 237 households, out of which 35.4% had children under the age of 18 living with them, 43.5% were married couples living together, 21.5% had a female householder with no husband present, and 30.0% were non-families. 26.2% of all households were made up of individuals, and 9.7% had someone living alone who was 65 years of age or older.  The average household size was 2.79 and the average family size was 3.34.

In the city, the population was spread out, with 31.1% under the age of 18, 11.2% from 18 to 24, 28.7% from 25 to 44, 17.8% from 45 to 64, and 11.2% who were 65 years of age or older.  The median age was 30 years. For every 100 females, there were 97.6 males.  For every 100 females age 18 and over, there were 90.8 males.

The median income for a household in the city was $21,136, and the median income for a family was $27,188. Males had a median income of $24,135 versus $16,563 for females. The per capita income for the city was $8,986.  About 26.9% of families and 32.4% of the population were below the poverty line, including 43.2% of those under age 18 and 31.5% of those age 65 or over.

Infrastructure

Highways
  U.S. Highway 79
  Arkansas Highway 98
  Arkansas Highway 98 Business

Climate
The climate in this area is characterized by hot, humid summers and generally mild to cool winters.  According to the Köppen Climate Classification system, McNeil has a humid subtropical climate, abbreviated "Cfa" on climate maps.

Education

Students are assigned to the Magnolia School District which operates Magnolia High School.

It was previously in the McNeil School District. On July 1, 2004 it consolidated into the Stephens School District. According to the Stephens school district's attorney, Clay Fendley, there was, in the words of Mike McNeill of the Magnolia Reporter, "bitterness" resulting from the McNeil consolidation.

The Arkansas Board of Education (ABE) voted to dissolve the Stephens School District in 2014, and the portion serving McNeil was given to the Magnolia School District. Before the ABE made its final decision to break up the Stephens district, it was deciding whether to consolidate it entirely with the Nevada School District or divide it into three pieces.

References

External links
Logoly State Park

Cities in Arkansas
Cities in Columbia County, Arkansas